Dendropsophus rhea is a species of frog in the family Hylidae.
It is endemic to Brazil.
Its natural habitats are moist savanna, freshwater marshes, and intermittent freshwater marshes.
It is threatened by habitat loss.

References

Sources

rhea
Endemic fauna of Brazil
Amphibians described in 1999
Taxonomy articles created by Polbot